Ade Franci Alleyne-Forte (born 11 October 1988, San Fernando, Trinidad and Tobago) is a Trinidadian sprinter specialising in the 400 metres. He competed in the 4 × 400 metres relay at the 2012 Summer Olympics winning the bronze medal. He repeated that success at the 2016 World Indoor Championships.

His personal bests in the event are 46.13 seconds outdoors (Port of Spain 2012) and 46.88 seconds indoors (College Station 2013).

Competition record

References

External links
 
 Ade Alleyne-Forte at LSU Tigers
 

1988 births
Living people
Trinidad and Tobago male sprinters
Olympic athletes of Trinidad and Tobago
Olympic bronze medalists for Trinidad and Tobago
Athletes (track and field) at the 2012 Summer Olympics
Medalists at the 2012 Summer Olympics
Olympic bronze medalists in athletics (track and field)
People from San Fernando, Trinidad and Tobago
World Athletics Indoor Championships medalists